Peak 2266 is the second highest point in Minnesota, after Eagle Mountain. It is rarely climbed and has no summit trail. Peak 2266 was surveyed in 1961, in the same survey which established Eagle Mountain as the state's high point. The survey found that 2266 was also higher than the previous record holder, point 2230 in the Misquah Hills.

References

Mountains of Cook County, Minnesota
Mountains of Minnesota